Namiki Shōzō II (並木正三)(died 1807) was a kabuki playwright and relative of the more prominent Namiki Shōzō I. Though none of his surviving plays are prominent ones, he may have been the author of the 1801 Kezairoku (or Gezairoku), a kabuki playwriting manual.

References
Takaya, Ted T. (1985). "Namiki Shōzō." Kodansha Encyclopedia of Japan. Tokyo: Kodansha Ltd.

Kabuki playwrights
1807 deaths
Year of birth missing
Japanese dramatists and playwrights
Japanese writers of the Edo period
18th-century Japanese writers
19th-century Japanese writers
18th-century Japanese people
19th-century Japanese people